Beatrice I, also known as Beatrice of Franconia (1037 – 13 July 1061), was Abbess of Gandersheim Abbey from 1043 and Princess-Abbess of Quedlinburg Abbey from 1044 until her death.

Beatrix was born in Italy towards the end of 1037 as the only child of the Holy Roman Emperor Henry III and his first wife, Gunhilda of Denmark, who died about six months after Beatrice's birth.

Reign as princess-abbess

Consecration 

On 14 January 1044, after the death of her kinswoman, Abbess Adelaide I, Beatrice was installed as Abbess of Gandersheim Abbey by her father, overriding the right of the canonesses to elect their own head.

Conflicts 

In Gandersheim, she was at the centre of a long-running conflict with the canonesses, who accused her of subinfeudating estates of the abbey that were intended for the direct support of the community, and thereby bringing them into financial hardship. Three popes were involved in this affair, which went on for years: Leo IX decided initially in favour of the canonesses; Victor II reversed the decision in favour of the abbess. Finally, Stephen IX set out a compromise, at the end of 1057, which was apparently that the prebendal estates of the community were to be reserved for its upkeep, but that the abbess had the right to manage freely the remaining estates and her own properties as she saw fit.

Even this solution held only until the death of Beatrice; under her successor, her half-sister Adelaide II, the conflict broke out all over again.

Death 

Beatrice died on 13 July 1061. She was buried in the abbey church of Quedlinburg but her remains must have been removed elsewhere after the disastrous fire of 1070. A lead casket, which almost certainly contains the bones of Beatrice, has been preserved in Michaelstein Abbey since about 1161. In the crypt of the rebuilt church at Quedlinburg a tablet from the time of its rededication in 1129 serves as Beatrice's memorial.

References
 Black-Veldtrup, Mechthild, 1995: Kaiserin Agnes (1043-1077): Quellenkritische Studien. Cologne: Böhlau
 Boshof, Egon, 2000: Die Salier. Stuttgart: Kohlhammer Verlag
 Kronenberg, Kurt, 1981: Die Äbtissinen des Reichsstifts Gandersheim. Bad Gandersheim: Verlag Gandersheimer Tageblatt
 Vogtherr, Thomas, 2002: Die salischen Äbtissinnen des Reichsstifts Quedlinburg, in: Von sacerdotium und regnum, pp. 405–420. Cologne: Böhlau

Ancestry

External links / Sources
 genealogie-mittelalter.de: Beatrix I 
 Image of Beatrice

1037 births
11th-century German women
Salian dynasty
Abbesses of Quedlinburg
1061 deaths
German princesses
Abbesses of Gandersheim
Daughters of emperors
Daughters of kings